St. Martin is a Gothic church and the associated Catholic parish in Lorch am Rhein, Hesse, Germany. In 2002, it became part of the Rhine Gorge, a UNESCO World Heritage Site. The church features the oldest and largest monochrome wood-carved altar in Germany. Its organ from 1984 makes it also a concert venue, where international organists such as Olivier Latry have performed.

History 

The present Gothic building was begun in the 13th century, replacing an earlier Romanesque basilica. The choir was built first, around 1270, possibly by craftspeople who also worked at the Cologne Cathedral. After an interruption, the main nave was built from around 1304. A second nave was begun in 1398. The steeple was erected on the foundation of a watch tower from Roman times. The front to the West was remodelled by an entrance hall around 1480. A fire destroyed the roof of the church and the steeple in 1554, repairs were done by 1576 and 1578 respectively.

The parish was part of the Diocese of Mainz until the Diocese of Limburg was founded.

In 2002, it became part of the Rhine Gorge UNESCO World Heritage Site.

Features 

The church's high altar is from 1483. The monochrome carved wooden altar was attributed to the workshop of Master Hans (Bilger) from Worms, but this is not confirmed, and comparison to other works by him raises doubts. The altar is the highest and first monochrome carved altar in Germany.

The church features choir benches from the end of the 13th century with carvings of figures, a Gothic tabernacle from the 15th century. Many of the church's valuable religious art works were sold in the 19th century by parson Geiger to finance a renovation; remaining pieces include a Pietà from ca. 1400 and a baptismal font from 1464. Two altars in the aisles are from the shop of Hans Steinlein.

Organ 

The organ has 43 stops, three manuals and pedal. The church has been the venue of the annual organ concert of the Rheingau Musik Festival from its beginning in 1987, with performers such as Marie-Claire Alain, Edgar Krapp, and Olivier Latry from Notre-Dame de Paris who played on 7 July 2019. Johannes von Erdmann, organist at the church from 1987 to 2001, made recordings on the organ.

References

Literature

External links 

 
 Pfarrkirche St. Martin in Lorch rheingau.de
 Konservatorische Pflegemaßnahme an dem Hochaltar von 1483 im Hochchor der kath. Pfarrkirche St. Martin in 65391 Lorch am Rhein konservierung-restaurierung.de
 Hans Hubach: Überlegungen zum Meister des Lorcher Hochaltarretabels core.ac.uk 1993
 Christa Kaddar: Ein Zentrum sakraler Kunst / Der Rheinsteig in Lorch führt direkt an wahren Schätzen in der Pfarrkirche St. Martin vorbe (in German) kirchenzeitung.de March 2018

Gothic hall churches in Germany
Roman Catholic churches in Hesse
Rheingau-Taunus-Kreis
Churches in the Diocese of Limburg
Rheingau